Nurdavletovo (Nurdäwlät) is a rural locality (a village) in Zirgansky Selsoviet, Meleuzovsky District, Bashkortostan, Russia. The population was 102 as of 2010. There are 9 streets.

Geography 
Nurdavletovo is located 43 km north of Meleuz (the district's administrative centre) by road. Sabashevo is the nearest rural locality.

References 

Rural localities in Meleuzovsky District